Lamouchi ([lamuʃi]) is an Arabic surname. Notable people with the surname include:

Sabri Lamouchi (born 1971), French footballer and manager
Samir Lamouchi (born 1951), Tunisian volleyball player

Arabic-language surnames